1996 Orange Bowl may refer to:

 1996 Orange Bowl (January), between the Florida State Seminoles and the Notre Dame Fighting Irish
 1996 Orange Bowl (December), between the Nebraska Cornhuskers and the Virginia Tech Hokies